The 2021 Summer Biathlon World Championships will be held from 26 to 29 August 2021 in Nové Město, Czech Republic.

Medal summary

Medal table

Men

Women

References

Summer Biathlon World Championships
World Championships
2021 in Czech sport
International sports competitions hosted by the Czech Republic
August 2021 sports events in the Czech Republic